Constantin Anton (May 21, 1894 in Bucharest – March 17, 1993 in Bucharest) was a brigadier general of the Romanian Armed Forces during World War II. 

From 1944 to 1946, he served as the Inspector-General of the Jandarmeria Română, a Romanian military police force. In 1948, he was arrested and tried by the Bucharest People's Tribunal for "complicity with high treason". He was sentenced to 18 years of hard labor as a result. In 1952, his sentence was altered to 10 years in prison and demotion to civilian status. In 1959, he was released, and in 1964 he was reinstated to the military with the rank of divisional general.

References

Romanian Gendarmerie officers
Romanian military personnel of World War II
1894 births
1993 deaths
Romanian Land Forces generals
Military personnel from Bucharest
Prisoners and detainees of Romania
Romanian military personnel of World War I
Romanian military personnel of the Second Balkan War
Carol I National Defence University alumni
Recipients of the Order of the Crown (Romania)